John Latto Anderson (1881 – 11 May 1942) was a Scottish footballer who played as a centre half. He began his career at Dunfermline Athletic and had three years at Heart of Midlothian, but spent the majority of his career with Falkirk. He was in the Bairns team that finished runners-up in the Scottish Football League in the 1907–08 and 1909–10, but played no part in the club's Scottish Cup win of 1913, having more or less retired due to injury by that point. He had played in the 1903 Scottish Cup Final with Hearts, losing out to Rangers after two replays.

Anderson was selected once for the Scottish Football League XI, playing against the Irish League XI in 1911.

References

1881 births
1942 deaths
Footballers from Perth and Kinross
Scottish footballers
Association football defenders
Scottish Junior Football Association players
Dunfermline Athletic F.C. players
Heart of Midlothian F.C. players
Falkirk F.C. players
Scottish Football League players
Scottish Football League representative players